Balajub (also Romanized as Bālājūb and Bālā Jūb; also known as Bālājū) is a village in Garin Rural District, Zarrin Dasht District, Nahavand County, Hamadan Province, Iran. At the 2006 census, its population was 388, in 93 families.

References 

Populated places in Nahavand County